Yusuf Ssozi (born 20 December 1981) is a Ugandan-British former professional rugby league footballer who played in the 2000s.

Background
Yusef Sozi was born in Kampala, Uganda, as of 2008 he lived in Leeds with his girlfriend and their two daughters.

References

External links
London Broncos profile
(archived by web.archive.org) Sheffield Eagles profile
(archived by web.archive.org) Sheffield Eagles profile
(archived by web.archive.org) Sheffield Eagles profile
(archived by web.archive.org) SL stats

1981 births
Living people
Batley Bulldogs players
Bradford Bulls players
British rugby league players
Doncaster R.L.F.C. players
London Broncos players
Newcastle Thunder players
Rugby articles needing expert attention
Sheffield Eagles players
Sportspeople from Kampala
York City Knights players